Dasyloricaria is a genus of armored catfishes native to Central and South America. The distribution of these species includes the northwestern South America on the Pacific slope of Colombia and Panama. Its distribution is restricted to the Pacific slope of the Andes, which is a unique pattern of distribution within the subfamily.

Species
There are currently 3 recognized species in this genus:
 Dasyloricaria filamentosa (Steindachner, 1878) 
 Dasyloricaria latiura (C. H. Eigenmann & Vance, 1912) 
 Dasyloricaria paucisquama Londoño-Burbano & R. E. dos Reis, 2016

Description
Sexual dimorphism is similar to that of the Rineloricaria group, including hypertrophied odontodes forming brushes on the lateral surfaces of the head in mature males and papillose lips. However, it is also morphologically similar to members of the Loricariichthys group. It shares deep postorbital notches, an abdominal cover strongly structured, and a similar mouth shape; hypertrophied development of the lower lip has also been reported, a characteristic of representatives of the Loricariichthys group, suggesting that Dasyloricaria is also a lip brooder. Finally, with some representatives of the Loricaria group, it shares a triangular head, strong predorsal keels, and the upper caudal fin ray produced into a long whip. Dasyloricaria could represent a link between all other morphological groups.

References

 
Loricariini
Fish of Central America
Fish of South America
Catfish genera
Taxa named by Isaäc J. H. Isbrücker
Taxa named by Han Nijssen
Freshwater fish genera